Boulenophrys shuichengensis is a species of amphibian in the family Megophryidae.
It is endemic to China: it is only known from the type locality, Fenghuang Village in Shuicheng County, Guizhou.
Its natural habitats are subtropical or tropical moist montane forests and rivers.

References

Boulenophrys
Amphibians of China
Endemic fauna of China
Amphibians described in 2000
Taxonomy articles created by Polbot